Pitre Desmazeures (17 August 1880 – 7 October 1942) was an Australian cricketer. He played one first-class cricket match for Victoria in 1907 and one for South Australia in 1909/10.

See also
 List of Victoria first-class cricketers
 List of South Australian representative cricketers

References

External links
 

1880 births
1942 deaths
Australian cricketers
South Australia cricketers
Victoria cricketers
Cricketers from Melbourne